Jaʿfar b. ʿAlī Tabrizi (also known as Farīd al-Dīn and Qeblat al-Kottāb) was a renowned master in calligraphy as well as a poet and scribe in the 15th century. He was noted for being competent in Nastaʿlīq as well as other six classical scripts. His prominent student, Azhar Tabrizi once called Ja'far the second founder of Nastaʿlīq asserting that he even surpassed his teacher.

Biography
Jaʿfar Tabrizi had a great role in the evolution of the “Nastaʿlīq script” after Mir 'Ali Tabrizi - generally known as the inventor of the Nastaʿlīq script - canonised the newly emerged script.

Jaʿfar Tabrizi was moved from Tabriz to Herat along with some other painters and calligraphers to work for the young Timurid Prince Baysonghor following his campaign to Tabriz in 823/1420. He did enjoy the sobriquet Bāysonghorī  after being appointed to the head of the court library-workshop, where he was responsible for supervising the artistic projects as well as providing regular reports on the activities carried out in the library. Only one such report has survived to our time and is found in an album housed at the Topkapi Palace Library in Istanbul. It undated document is called the ʿArżeh-dāsht (petition), which contains information about several projects including the names of artists and artisans (calligrapher, painter, drawer, binder, illuminator, ruling-maker, etc.) involved in each section and their progress.

This important document was initially written in the format of scrolls, like verdicts and petitions used to be. It lacks bismillah at the beginning as well as the names of the sender and receiver, which in an official correspondence could only indicate that the heading and footing were damaged in the course of time and therefore trimmed. The size of the petition was basically one zar‘ (canonical cubit) long, which is 49.879 cm, meaning that the ʿArżeh-dāsht has lost approximately 4 cm of its initial length.

Works

Jaʿfar Tabrizi copied a number of manuscripts both before and after joining the royal library of Baysonqor Mīrzā. Among works in his hand are the sumptuous manuscript of the Bāysonghorī Shāhnāmeh (1430), the Golestān of Saʿdī (1427), Khosrow-o Shīrīn (1421), the Khamseh of Nezāmī (1431), Kulliyāt of Homām Tabrizi (1413), Nasāyeh-e Eskandar (1425), The Dīvān of Hasan Dehlavī (1422), Lamaʿāt of ʿIrāqī (1432), Kalīleh-o Demneh (1431), Tārīkh-e Iṣfahān (1431), and also Jong-e Marāsī, an elegy upon prince's death in 837/1433. Following Baysonqor's death, Jaʿfar worked under the patronage of prince's son, Ala al-Dawla. He wrote poems portraying his court position at the service of Shahrukh Mirza, Baysonqor and Ala al-Dawla. He died around 860/1455.

References

Calligraphers from Tabriz
Calligraphers of the medieval Islamic world
15th-century Iranian people
15th-century calligraphers